

A

B

C

D

E

F

G

H

I

J

K

L through Z